The Carolina Hurricanes are a professional ice hockey franchise based in Raleigh, North Carolina. They play in the Metropolitan Division of the Eastern Conference in the National Hockey League (NHL). The franchise was founded in 1971 as the New England Whalers, and relocated to North Carolina in 1997. Since arriving in North Carolina, the Hurricanes have drafted 90 players.

The NHL Entry Draft is held each June, allowing teams to select players who have turned 18 years old by September 15 in the year the draft is held. The draft order is determined by the previous season's order of finish, with non-playoff teams drafting first, followed by the teams that made the playoffs, with the specific order determined by the number of points earned by each team. The NHL holds a weighted lottery for the 14 non-playoff teams, allowing the winner to move up a maximum of four positions in the entry draft. The team with the fewest points has the best chance of winning the lottery, with each successive team given a lower chance of moving up in the draft. The Hurricanes have never won the lottery. Between 1986 and 1994, the NHL also held a Supplemental Draft for players in American colleges.

Carolina's first draft pick was Nikos Tselios, taken 22nd overall in the 1997 NHL Entry Draft. The highest that Carolina has drafted is second overall. They selected Eric Staal in 2003, and he went on to become the first player selected after the move from Hartford that went on to play over 1,000 NHL games. No Hurricanes picks have been elected to the Hockey Hall of Fame.

Key

Draft picks 
Statistics are complete as of the 2021–22 NHL season and show each player's career regular season totals in the NHL.  Wins, losses, ties, overtime losses and goals against average apply to goaltenders and are used only for players at that position. This list includes players drafted by the team in Carolina only.

See also 
 List of Carolina Hurricanes players
 List of Hartford Whalers draft picks

References 
 
 

draft
 
Carolina Hurricanes